A Little Journey is a 1927 American silent comedy film directed by Robert Z. Leonard and featuring Claire Windsor, William Haines and Harry Carey. It is based on a play by Rachel Crothers. No prints are thought to survive of this film. It is therefore considered lost.

Plot
A girl travelling by train to meet her boyfriend meets another young man and falls in love with him.

Cast
 Claire Windsor as Julia Rutherford
 William Haines as George Manning
 Harry Carey as Alexander Smith
 Claire McDowell as Aunt Louise
 Lawford Davidson as Alfred Demis

References

External links

 

1927 films
Silent American comedy films
American silent feature films
American black-and-white films
1927 comedy films
1927 lost films
Metro-Goldwyn-Mayer films
Lost American films
Films directed by Robert Z. Leonard
1920s American films